The following television stations broadcast on digital or analog channel 23 in Canada:

 CHAN-TV-6 in Wilson Creek, British Columbia
 CHCH-DT-3 in Muskoka, Ontario
 CIMT-DT-8 in Cabano, Quebec
 CIVI-DT in Victoria, British Columbia
 CIVP-DT in Chapeau, Quebec
 CJCH-TV-8 in Marinette, Nova Scotia
 CKTN-TV-2 in Taghum, British Columbia

23 TV stations in Canada